The 2006 World Junior Wrestling Championships were the 30th edition of the World Junior Wrestling Championships and were held in Guatemala City, Guatemala between August 28–September 3, 2006.

Medal table

Medal summary

Men's freestyle

Greco-Roman

Women's freestyle

References

External links 
 UWW Database

World Junior Championships
Wrestling Championships
International wrestling competitions hosted by Guatemala
Wrestling in Guatemala
World Junior Wrestling Championships
Sports competitions in Guatemala City